William Hayward may refer to:

William Hayward (politician) (1868–1943), member of the New Zealand Legislative Council, 1934–1941
William Hayward Jr. (1787–1836), U.S. politician
William Hayward Pickering (1910–2004), New Zealand rocket scientist
William Dutton Hayward (1815–1891), founder and namesake of the city of Hayward, California
William C. Hayward (1847–1917), American politician
William Henry Hayward (1867–1932), English-born farmer and political figure in British Columbia
Bill Hayward (1868–1947), track and field coach
Bill Hayward (rugby union), rugby player
Bill Hayward (educator) (born 1930), Australian educator and cricketer
William Hayward (bridge designer), 18th-century bridge designer as per Henley Bridge
William S. Hayward (1835–1900), baker, banker and mayor of Providence, Rhode Island
William Thornborough Hayward (1854–1928), medical doctor in South Australia
Bill Hayward (educator) (born 1930), Australian educator and cricketer
William Hayward (New Zealand cricketer) (1909–1982), New Zealand cricketer
William Hayward (architect) (died 1823), architect who worked in Lincoln, England
William Hayward (American attorney), American lawyer commanded the 369th Infantry Regiment

See also
William Haywood (disambiguation)